Rivery is a commune in the Somme department in Hauts-de-France in northern France.

Geography
Rivery is situated on the north-eastern outskirts of Amiens, on the other side of the Somme River and on the D1 road. The area is known for its market gardens, or hortillons, small patches of cultivated land between the drainage channels that prevent the area returning to marsh.

Population

See also
Communes of the Somme department

References

Communes of Somme (department)